Railroad ecology or railway ecology is a term used to refer to the study of the ecological community growing along railroad or railway tracks and the effects of railroads on natural ecosystems. Such ecosystems have been studied primarily in Europe. Similar conditions and effects appear also by roads used by vehicles. Railroads along with roads, canals, and power lines are examples of linear infrastructure intrusions.

Conditions

Railroad beds, like road beds, are designed to drain water away from the tracks, so there is usually a bed of rock and gravel resulting in fast drainage away from the tracks.  At the same time, this drainage often accumulates in areas fairly near the tracks where drainage is poor, forming small artificial wetlands.  These unnatural conditions combine to form different zones, some in which water is scarce, others in which water is abundant.

Maintenance

Railroad companies routinely clear-cut and/or spray with herbicide any vegetation that grows too close to the tracks.  This favors vegetation that is able to respond favorably to clearcutting, and/or resist herbicides.

On overhead electrified railroad lines, clear-cutting must be more extensive, vertically as well as horizontally, in order to prevent vegetation (especially tree limbs) from interfering with the pantographs on a moving train, breaking off and falling on the wires, or simply from arcing in proximity to high voltage transmission cables. The same vegetative selection processes described in the previous paragraph apply, but may additionally favor climbing vines due to the presence of catenary and transmission poles in addition to the wooden communications and signal pole lines which often exist(ed) along nonelectrified lines.

History

Historically, conditions along railroad beds were very different from today. Coal engines used to blanket the area with soot, favoring species adapted to these conditions (some of which only occurred naturally in volcanic areas). Newer engines produced a less remarkable environment, but many of the same plants have remained and adapted to this new environment.

Ecological effects

Invasive Species 
Railway tracks (like roads and highways) are often colonized by non-native invasive species.  In North America, such species include trees such as Ailanthus altissima, Paulownia tomentosa, Siberian Elm, and Norway Maple, and invasive non-woody plants such as Japanese Knotweed and Phragmites.  The railway tracks provide corridors along which these species can spread and thrive, even when the surrounding areas might be less hospitable to them.

Wildlife mortality 
Wildlife species from smaller birds and mammals to deer and large mammals such as elephants may be killed in collisions with trains running on railway tracks.

See also

Ecotope

References

 C. Sargent, D. W. Shimwell (reviewer).  "Britain's Railway Vegetation"  Journal of Applied Ecology, Vol. 22, No. 2, pp. 599–600 (1985)
 Borda-de-Água, L., Barrientos, R., Beja, P. & Pereira, H.M. (eds). (2017) Railway Ecology. Springer International Publishing, Cham.

Ecoregions
Rail infrastructure
Linear infrastructure intrusions